The 1981 All-Ireland Senior Club Camogie Championship for the leading clubs in the women's team field sport of camogie was won by Buffers Alley from Wexford, who defeated Killeagh from Cork in the final, played at Gaultier . It was the first leg of a record four in a row won by the club.

Arrangements
The championship was organised on the traditional provincial system used in Gaelic Games since the 1880s, with Oranmore and Kilkeel winning the championships of the other two provinces. Margaret Leacy who had missed the previous season returned to the Buffers Alley team and her presence was a factor in their reversing the result in the 1980 final.

The Final
Buffers Alley went five points up in the first ten minutes of the final and won by five.

Final stages

References

External links
 Camogie Association

1981 in camogie
1981